Elizabeth Spender (born 1950) is a film and television actress.

Biography

She is the daughter of concert pianist Natasha Spender (née Litvin) and the poet, novelist and essayist Stephen Spender.

Among numerous television and film credits, she appeared in Terry Gilliam's 1985 cult film Brazil.

Since 1990 she has been married to the Australian actor and satirist Barry Humphries.

Select filmography

External links

Living people
English film actresses
English people of German-Jewish descent
Jewish English actresses
1950 births